Taurus (Latin for "the Bull") is one of the constellations of the zodiac and is located in the northern celestial hemisphere. Taurus is a large and prominent constellation in the Northern Hemisphere's winter sky. It is one of the oldest constellations, dating back to the Early Bronze Age at least, when it marked the location of the Sun during the spring equinox. Its importance to the agricultural calendar influenced various bull figures in the mythologies of Ancient Sumer, Akkad, Assyria, Babylon, Egypt, Greece, and Rome.

A number of features exist that are of interest to astronomers. Taurus hosts two of the nearest open clusters to Earth, the Pleiades and the Hyades, both of which are visible to the naked eye. At first magnitude, the red giant Aldebaran is the brightest star in the constellation. In the northeast part of Taurus is Messier 1, more commonly known as the Crab Nebula, a supernova remnant containing a pulsar. One of the closest regions of active star formation, the Taurus-Auriga complex, crosses into the northern part of the constellation. The variable star T Tauri is the prototype of a class of pre-main-sequence stars.

Characteristics
Taurus is a large and prominent constellation in the northern hemisphere's winter sky, between Aries to the west and Gemini to the east; to the north lies Perseus and Auriga, to the southeast Orion, to the south Eridanus, and to the southwest Cetus. In late November-early December, Taurus reaches opposition (furthest point from the Sun) and is visible the entire night. By late March, it is setting at sunset and completely disappears behind the Sun's glare from May to July.

This constellation forms part of the zodiac and hence is intersected by the ecliptic. This circle across the celestial sphere forms the apparent path of the Sun as the Earth completes its annual orbit. As the orbital plane of the Moon and the planets lie near the ecliptic, they can usually be found in the constellation Taurus during some part of each year. The galactic plane of the Milky Way intersects the northeast corner of the constellation and the galactic anticenter is located near the border between Taurus and Auriga. Taurus is the only constellation crossed by all three of the galactic equator, celestial equator, and ecliptic. A ring-like galactic structure known as Gould's Belt passes through the constellation.

The recommended three-letter abbreviation for the constellation, as adopted by the International Astronomical Union in 1922, is "Tau". The official constellation boundaries, as set by Belgian astronomer Eugène Delporte in 1930, are defined by a polygon of 26 segments. Because a small part of the constellation lies to the south of the celestial equator, this can not be a completely circumpolar constellation at any latitude.

Features

Stars 

There are four stars above magnitude 3 in Taurus.

The brightest member of this constellation is Aldebaran, an orange-hued, spectral class K5 III giant star. Forming the profile of a Bull's face is a V or K-shaped asterism of stars. This outline is created by prominent members of the Hyades, the nearest distinct open star cluster after the Ursa Major Moving Group. In this profile, Aldebaran forms the bull's bloodshot eye, which has been described as "glaring menacingly at the hunter Orion", a constellation that lies just to the southeast. Aldebaran has around 116% the mass of the Sun. It also hosts a candidate exoplanet.

The Hyades span about 5° of the sky, so that they can only be viewed in their entirety with binoculars or the unaided eye. It includes a naked eye double star, Theta Tauri (the proper name of Theta2 Tauri is Chamukuy), with a separation of 5.6 arcminutes.

In the northwestern quadrant of the Taurus constellation lie the Pleiades (M45), one of the best known open clusters, easily visible to the naked eye. The seven most prominent stars in this cluster are at least visual magnitude six, and so the cluster is also named the "Seven Sisters". However, many more stars are visible with even a modest telescope. Astronomers estimate that the cluster has approximately 500–1,000 stars, all of which are around 100 million years old. However, they vary considerably in type. The Pleiades themselves are represented by large, bright stars; also many small brown dwarfs and white dwarfs exist. The cluster is estimated to dissipate in another 250 million years. The Pleiades cluster is classified as a Shapley class c and Trumpler class I 3 r n cluster, indicating that it is irregularly shaped and loose, though concentrated at its center and detached from the star-field.

To the east, the two horns of the bull are formed by Beta (β) Tauri and Zeta (ζ) Tauri; two star systems that are separated by 8°. Beta is a white, spectral class B7 III giant star known as El Nath, which comes from the Arabic phrase "the butting", as in butting by the horns of the bull. At magnitude 1.65, it is the second brightest star in the constellation, and shares the border with the neighboring constellation of Auriga. As a result, it also bears the designation Gamma Aurigae. Zeta Tauri (the proper name is Tianguan) is an eclipsing binary star that completes an orbit every 133 days.

The star Lambda (λ) Tauri is an eclipsing binary star. This system consists of a spectral class B3 star being orbited by a less massive class A4 star. The plane of their orbit lies almost along the line of sight to the Earth. Every 3.953 days the system temporarily decreases in brightness by 1.1 magnitudes as the brighter star is partially eclipsed by the dimmer companion. The two stars are separated by only 0.1 astronomical units, so their shapes are modified by mutual tidal interaction. This results in a variation of their net magnitude throughout each orbit.

Located about 1.8° west of Epsilon (ε) Tauri is T Tauri, the prototype of a class of variable stars called T Tauri stars. This star undergoes erratic changes in luminosity, varying between magnitude 9 to 13 over a period of weeks or months. This is a newly formed stellar object that is just emerging from its envelope of gas and dust, but has not yet become a main sequence star. The surrounding reflection nebula NGC 1555 is illuminated by T Tauri, and thus is also variable in luminosity. To the north lies Kappa Tauri, a visual double star consisting of two A7-type components. The pair have a separation of just 5.6 arc minutes, making them a challenge to split with the naked eye.

Deep-sky objects

In the northern part of the constellation to the northeast of the Pleiades lies the Crystal Ball Nebula, known by its catalogue designation of NGC 1514. This planetary nebula is of historical interest following its discovery by German-born English astronomer William Herschel in 1790. Prior to that time, astronomers had assumed that nebulae were simply unresolved groups of stars. However, Herschel could clearly resolve a star at the center of the nebula that was surrounded by a nebulous cloud of some type. In 1864, English astronomer William Huggins used the spectrum of this nebula to deduce that the nebula is a luminous gas, rather than stars.

North-west of ζ Tauri by 1.15 degrees is the Crab Nebula (M1), a supernova remnant. This expanding nebula was created by a Type II supernova explosion, which was seen from Earth on July 4, 1054. It was bright enough to be observed during the day and is mentioned in Chinese historical texts. At its peak, the supernova reached magnitude −4, but the nebula is currently magnitude 8.4 and requires a telescope to observe. North American peoples also observed the supernova, as evidenced from a painting on a New Mexican canyon and various pieces of pottery that depict the event. However, the remnant itself was not discovered until 1731, when John Bevis found it.

This constellation includes part of the Taurus-Auriga complex, or Taurus dark clouds, a star-forming region containing sparse, filamentary clouds of gas and dust. Located in this region, about 10° to the northeast of Aldebaran, is an asterism NGC 1746 spanning a width of 45 arcminutes.

Meteor showers 
During November, the Taurid meteor shower appears to radiate from the general direction of this constellation. The Beta Taurid meteor shower occurs during the months of June and July in the daytime, and is normally observed using radio techniques. Between 18 and 29 October, both the Northern Taurids and the Southern Taurids are active; though the latter stream is stronger. However, between November 1 and 10, the two streams equalize.

History and mythology

The identification of the constellation of Taurus with a bull is very old, certainly dating to the Chalcolithic, and perhaps even to the Upper Paleolithic. Michael Rappenglück of the University of Munich believes that Taurus is represented in a cave painting at the Hall of the Bulls in the caves at Lascaux (dated to roughly 15,000 BC), which he believes is accompanied by a depiction of the Pleiades. The name "seven sisters" has been used for the Pleiades in the languages of many cultures, including indigenous groups of Australia, North America and Siberia. This suggests that the name may have a common ancient origin.

Taurus marked the point of vernal (spring) equinox in the Chalcolithic and the Early Bronze Age, from about 4000 BC to 1700 BC, after which it moved into the neighboring constellation Aries. The Pleiades were closest to the Sun at vernal equinox around the 23rd century BC. Although it has been claimed that "when the Babylonians first set up their zodiac, the vernal equinox lay in Taurus," there is a claim that the MUL.APIN tablets indicate that the vernal equinox was marked by the Babylonian constellation known as "the hired man" (the modern Aries).

In the Old Babylonian Epic of Gilgamesh, the goddess Ishtar sends Taurus, the Bull of Heaven, to kill Gilgamesh for spurning her advances. Enkidu tears off the bull's hind part and hurls the quarters into the sky where they become the stars we know as Ursa Major and Ursa Minor. Some locate Gilgamesh as the neighboring constellation of Orion, facing Taurus as if in combat, while others identify him with the sun whose rising on the equinox vanquishes the constellation. In early Mesopotamian art, the Bull of Heaven was closely associated with Inanna, the Sumerian goddess of sexual love, fertility, and warfare. One of the oldest depictions shows the bull standing before the goddess' standard; since it has 3 stars depicted on its back (the cuneiform sign for "star-constellation"), there is good reason to regard this as the constellation later known as Taurus.

The same iconic representation of the Heavenly Bull was depicted in the Dendera zodiac, an Egyptian bas-relief carving in a ceiling that depicted the celestial hemisphere using a planisphere. In these ancient cultures, the orientation of the horns was portrayed as upward or backward. This differed from the later Greek depiction where the horns pointed forward. To the Egyptians, the constellation Taurus was a sacred bull that was associated with the renewal of life in spring. When the spring equinox entered Taurus, the constellation would become covered by the Sun in the western sky as spring began. This "sacrifice" led to the renewal of the land. To the early Hebrews, Taurus was the first constellation in their zodiac and consequently it was represented by the first letter in their alphabet, Aleph.

In Greek mythology, Taurus was identified with Zeus, who assumed the form of a magnificent white bull to abduct Europa, a legendary Phoenician princess. In illustrations of Greek mythology, only the front portion of this constellation is depicted; this was sometimes explained as Taurus being partly submerged as he carried Europa out to sea. A second Greek myth portrays Taurus as Io, a mistress of Zeus. To hide his lover from his wife Hera, Zeus changed Io into the form of a heifer. Greek mythographer Acusilaus marks the bull Taurus as the same that formed the myth of the Cretan Bull, one of The Twelve Labors of Heracles.

Taurus became an important object of worship among the Druids. Their Tauric religious festival was held while the Sun passed through the constellation. Among the arctic people known as the Inuit, the constellation is called Sakiattiat and the Hyades is Nanurjuk, with the latter representing the spirit of the polar bear. Aldebaran represents the bear, with the remainder of the stars in the Hyades being dogs that are holding the beast at bay.

In Buddhism, legends hold that Gautama Buddha was born when the full moon was in Vaisakha, or Taurus. Buddha's birthday is celebrated with the Wesak Festival, or Vesākha, which occurs on the first or second full moon when the Sun is in Taurus.

In 1990, due to the precession of the equinoxes, the position of the Sun on the first day of summer (June 21) crossed the IAU boundary of Gemini into Taurus. The Sun will slowly move through Taurus at a rate of 1° east every 72 years until approximately 2600 AD, at which point it will be in Aries on the first day of summer.

Astrology

, the Sun appears in the constellation Taurus from May 13 to June 21. In tropical astrology, the Sun is considered to be in the sign Taurus from April 20 to May 20.

Space exploration
The space probe Pioneer 10 is moving in the direction of this constellation, though it will not be nearing any of the stars in this constellation for many thousands of years, by which time its batteries will be long dead.

Solar eclipse of May 29, 1919
Several stars in the Hyades star cluster, including Kappa Tauri, were photographed during the total solar eclipse of May 29, 1919, by the expedition of Arthur Eddington in Príncipe and others in Sobral, Brazil, that confirmed Albert Einstein's prediction of the bending of light around the Sun according to his general theory of relativity which he published in 1915.

See also
 IC 1838
 Pleiades in folklore and literature
 Taurus (Chinese astronomy)

Notes

References

Book references

External links

 The Deep Photographic Guide to the Constellations: Taurus
 BBC article on the possibility of Taurus being represented in Lascaux
 Star Tales – Taurus
 Warburg Institute Iconographic Database (medieval and early modern images of Taurus)
 The clickable Taurus

 
Constellations
Equatorial constellations
Constellations listed by Ptolemy